Quiet Storm is the seventh studio album by American R&B group Silk. It was released by Shanachie Records on March 18, 2016 in the United States. Their first album in a decade, it peaked at number 26 on the US Top R&B/Hip-Hop Albums chart.

Critical reception

Exclaim! critic Matt Bauer remarked that Quiet Storm "doesn't stray far from the lush, melodic harmonies that enticed listeners out of their Karl Kanis and into their boudoirs with such well crafted, carnally minded gems as "Girl U For Me" and "It Had to Be You" [...] While this comeback falls short of Silk's previous efforts, Quiet Storm is sure to be the soundtrack to more than a few romantic encounters.

Track listing

Charts

Release history

References

Silk (group) albums
2016 albums
Shanachie Records albums